Kikuyu or Gikuyu is a Bantu language spoken by the Gĩkũyũ (Agĩkũyũ) of Kenya. Kikuyu is mainly spoken in the area between Nyeri and Nairobi. The Kikuyu people usually identify their lands by the surrounding mountain ranges in Central Kenya which they call Kĩrĩnyaga. The Gikuyu language is intelligibly similar to its surrounding neighbors, the Meru and Embu.

Dialects
Kikuyu has four main mutually intelligible dialects. The Central Province districts are divided along the traditional boundaries of these dialects, which are Kĩrĩnyaga, Mũrang'a, Nyeri and Kiambu. The Kikuyu from Kĩrĩnyaga are composed of two main sub-dialects – the Ndia and Gichugu who speak the dialects Kĩndia and Gĩgĩcũgũ. The Gicugus and the Ndias do not have the "ch" or "sh" sound, and will use the "s" sound instead, hence the pronunciation of "Gĩcũgũ" as opposed to "Gĩchũgũ". To hear Ndia being spoken, one needs to be in Kerugoya, the largest town in Kîrînyaga. Other home towns for the Ndia, where "purer" forms of the dialect are spoken, are located in the tea-growing areas of Kagumo, Baricho, Kagio, and the Kangaita hills. Lower down the slopes is Kutus, which is a bustling town with so many influences from the other dialects that it is difficult to distinguish between them. The dialect is also prevalent in the rice growing area of Mwea.

The unmistakable tonal patterns of the Gichũgũ dialect (which sounds like Meru or Embu, sister languages to Kikuyu) can be heard in the coffee-growing areas of Kianyaga, Gĩthũre, Kathũngũri, Marigiti. The Gichugu switch easily to other Kikuyu dialects in conversation with the rest of the Kikuyu.

Phonology
Symbols shown in parentheses are those used in the orthography.

Vowels

Consonants

Tones
Kikuyu has two level tones (high and low), a low-high rising tone, and downstep.

Grammar
The canonical word order of Gĩkũyũ is SVO (subject–verb–object). It uses prepositions rather than postpositions, and adjectives follow nouns.

Alphabet
Kikuyu is written in a Latin alphabet. It does not use the letters l f p  q  s  v  x  z, and adds the letters ĩ and ũ. The Kikuyu alphabet is:
a  b  c  d  e  g  h  i  ĩ  j  k  m  n  o  r t  u  ũ  w  y

Some sounds are represented by digraphs such as ng for the velar nasal .

Sample phrases

Literature
There is notable literature written in the Kikuyu language. For instance, Ngũgĩ wa Thiong'o's Mũrogi wa Kagogo (Wizard of the Crow) is the longest known book written in Kikuyu. Other authors writing in Kikuyu are Gatua wa Mbũgwa and Waithĩra wa Mbuthia. Mbuthia has published various works in different genres—essays, poetry, children stories and translations—in Kikuyu. The late Wahome Mutahi also sometimes wrote in Kikuyu. Also, Gakaara wa Wanjaũ wrote his popular book, Mau Mau Author in Detention, which won a Noma Award in 1984.

In popular culture 
In the 1983 movie Star Wars Episode VI: Return of the Jedi, the character Nien Nunb speaks in the Kikuyu language.

References

Bibliography

Armstrong, Lilias E. 1967. The Phonetic and Tonal Structure of Kikuyu. London: Published for the International African Institute by Dawsons of Pall Mall.
Barlow, A. Ruffell and T. G. Benson. 1975. English-Kikuyu Dictionary. Oxford: Clarendon Press.
Barlow, A. Ruffell. 1951. Studies in Kikuyu Grammar and Idiom. Edinburgh: William Blackwood & Sons,
Benson, T. G. 1964. Kikuyu–English Dictionary. Oxford: Clarendon Press.
Gecaga B. M. and Kirkaldy-Willis W.H. 1953. English–Kikuyu, Kikuyu–English Vocabulary. Nairobi: The Eagle Press.
Leakey L. S. B. 1989. First Lessons in Kikuyu. Nairobi: Kenya Literature Bureau.
Mugane John 1997. A Paradigmatic Grammar of Gikuyu. Stanford, California: CSLI publications.

External links

Robert Englebretson (ed.), "A Basic Sketch Grammar of Gĩkũyũ", 2015.
Gikuyu alphabet and pronunciation at Omniglot
African Language Resources
Muigwithania 2.0 – First Kikuyu Newspaper revived on the Internet
PanAfrican L10n page on Gikuyu
Gikuyu blog
Gĩkũyũ Language Page (Wiki Created by Linguistic Field Methods Course at UMass Amherst)
First Course in Kikuyu (vol. 1; see ref. for v2 & v3)
My First Gikuyu Dictionary

 
Kikuyu
Northeast Bantu languages
Subject–verb–object languages
Languages of Kenya